Sylvia Reyes La Torre-Perez de Tagle (June 4, 1933 – December 1, 2022) was a Filipino singer, actress, and radio star.

Early life
La Torre was born on June 4, 1933 to director Olive La Torre and actress Leonora Reyes.

Career

Singing
La Torre's singing career started in 1938 at the age of five, when she entered a singing competition in Manila. She also attended the University of Santo Tomas Conservatory of Music under a scholarship and also became a frequent feature at the Manila Grand Opera House.

She would gain the reputation of being the "Queen of Kundiman" for performing hundreds of songs such as "Mutya ng Pasig", "Waray-Waray" and "Maalaala Mo Kaya". 

She would continue to perform, even as she emigrated to the United States. In 2017, she worked with the Filipino-American Symphony Orchestra.

Radio, television, and film
La Torre was a child actress, first appearing in the 1941 film Ang Maestra. She would feature in other films made by Sampaguita Pictures. 

In 1960, La Torre featured in the radio program Tuloy ang Ligaya of Manila Broadcasting Company (MBC) with Lita Guttierez and Oscar Obligacion. The radio program was made into a television program known as The Big Show which was hosted by La Torre and Obligacion. Due to the success of The Big Show. ABS-CBN would offer the two to host its noontime television show Oras ng Ligaya. For this, she earned the title "First Lady of Philippine Television".

La Torre's filmography spans until the 1990s. Among her noted films are Ulila ng Bataan and Buhay Pilipino in 1952 and Nukso nang nukso in 1960.
She would also star in the 1988 Seiko film One Two Bato, Three Four Bapor.

Personal life
La Torre was married to Celso Perez de Tagle, a dentist, with whom she had three children. Her granddaughter, Anna Maria Perez de Tagle, is also an actress, known for appearing in Hannah Montana and Camp Rock. La Torre was also a devout Roman Catholic. Her family emigrated to the United States in the 1980s where she continued performing.

Death
La Torre died in her sleep on December 1, 2022.

Filmography
1941 - Ang Maestra
1949 - Biro ng Tadhana
1952 - Buhay Pilipino
1952 - Ulila ng Bataan
1952 - Gorio at Tekla
1953 - Munting Koronel
1953 - Ang Asawa Kong Americana
1958 - My Little Kuwan
1959 - Puro Utos, Puro Utos
1959 - Nukso ng Nukso
1960 - Yantok Mindoro
1961 - Oh Sendang
1962 - Tang-taran-tang
1963 - Sakay and Moy
1974 - Oh Maggie Oh
1978 - Chimoy at Chimay
1987 - Jack & Jill as Doña Estrella "Star" Bartolome
1988 - One Two Bato, Three Four Bapor
1989 - M&M, the Incredible Twins
1993 - Ligaw-ligawan Kasal-kasalan Bahay-bahayan
1997 - Biyudo Si Daddy, Biyuda Si Mommy
2001-2002 - Biglang Sibol, Bayang Impasibol

Discography
Akala'y Totoo (Pangarap Lang Pala)
Ako Ay Iyo - 1959
Ako'y Kampupot - 1954
Ako'y Lumuluha
Ako'y Nagmamahal - 1961
Alak (record) - 1965
Alembong - 1958
Alibambang
Aling Kutsero - 1956
Anak ni Waray - 1959
Ano Ba - 1959
Ang Giliw Na Ibig Ko - 1960
Ang Dalagang Nayon
Ang Hirap Kay' Inday
Ang Kasing-Kasing ko
Ang Langit Ko'y Ikaw
Ang Paglalaba
Ano Ba
Ano Kaya ang Kapalaran - 1955
Arimunding-Munding - 1953
Asahan Mo
Atik
Awat na Adyang - 1961
Ay Anong Saklap - 1960
Ay Kalisud - 1954
"Babalik Ka Rin"
"Bahala Na" - 1956
"Bahay-Kubo (Sylvia)" - 1966
"Bakit Mo Ako Pinaluha"
"Banahaw"
"Basang Sisiw"
"Basta't Mahal Kita" - 1959
"Batanguena" - 1954
"Binatang Kapampangan"
"Bingwit ng Pag-ibig"
"Binibiro Lamang Kita"
"Biru-Biruan"
"Bituing Marikit" - 1952
"Buhay sa Nayon"
"Bulaklak at Paru-Paro" - 1954
"Carinosa"
"Chimoy at Chimay" - 1973
"Dadaldal-Daldal"
"Dahil Sa Polka" - 1965
"Dahil sa Iyo"
"Dahil sa Polka"
"Dalaga't Binata"
"Dankasi'y Tuwis Ka ng Tuwis" (1962)
"Di Magtataksil"
"Di Mahahadlangan"
Easy Ka Lang Padre - 1956
Etcetera...Etcetera...Etcetera... - 1966
Ewan Ko Ba - 1962
Fiesta - 1960
Galawgaw - 1955
Ginintuang Ani - 1954
Gintong Silahis - 1954
Golpe de Gulat - 1967
Granada (Sylvia) - 1968
Habang May Buhay - 1965
Halikan Mo Ako Darling - 1959
Halina't Magsaya
Handang Matodas
Hanee-Hanee
Hanggang Langit
Hanggang sa Mag-Umaga
Hijo de Familia
Hindi Basta-Basta - 1956
Hindi Na Nagbalik
Hirap ng Umibig
Huwag Ka Sanang Pikon - 1962
Ibong Sawi - 1953
Ikaw
Ikaw Kasi - 1956
Ikinalulungkot Ko
Ilang-Ilang - 1954
Inday Palalayasin Kita
Irog Kay Sarap
Irog Ko
Irog ng Buhay
Irogm Nasaan ang Pag-ibig
Isang Aral - 1967
Iyung-Iyo
Jukebox Rock
Kalesa - 1959
Kasalanan Ba ang Umibig
Kasing Bango ng Pagsinta - 1954
Katakataka
Katimbang ng Buhay
Katuwaan
Kikisay-Kisay
Kulasisi - 1954 
Kumare, Kumpadre 1952 (Sylvia La Torre & Alfred La Roza)
Kung Akoy Iibig
Kung Kita'y Kapiling
Kung Nagsasayaw
Laba-Laba-Laba
Lalake at Lamok
Larawan ng Pagsinta
Lawiswis Kawayan - 1954
Lihim Kitang Iniibig
Luha
Luha sa Hatinggabi
Luha sa Kalipay - 1954
Maalaala Mo Kaya
Mabuti Pa
Madaling Araw
Magkatuwaan - 1966
Magsaya ka't Ngumiti - 1967
Magsayawan
Magtiis ka Darling
Mahal na Mahal kita
Malaking Hirap
Maligayang Araw
Mamang Kartero
Manalig ka
Mang Teban
Masaganang Kabukiran - 1954
May Araw ka Rin
Mutya ng Pasig - 1952
Nagnakaw ng Halik - 1959
Nakakabum - 1969
Naman, Naman, Naman - 1970
Nangangarap
Nasaan
Nasaan Ang Aking Puso - 1968
Nasaan ang Sumpa Mo
Nasaan Ka Irog - 1952
No Money, No Honey - 1956
No Touch, Filipino Kostum
O.A.
One, Two, Three
Paglingap - 1953
Paglubog ng Araw
Pahiwatig - 1952
Pakiusap - 1952
Pakwan - 1959
Pamaypay ng Maynila - 1954
Pampahimbing - 1959
Pandanggo sa Pag-ibig
Pandangguhan (Sylvia) - 1954
Parti-Lain (Sylvia) - 1961
Paru-Paro sa Bulaklak
Peks Man
Phone Pal (Sylvia) - 1958
Please Lang - 1960
Pintasan - 1964
Pook na Kaakit-akit
Probinsyano (Sylvia) - 1959
Puting Teksas - 1961
Sa Bukid
Sa Duyan ng Pagmamahal
Sa Kabukiran - 1954
Sa Libis ng Nayon
Sa Pagpatak ng Ulan
Salawahan
Sampaguita
Singsing
Sino Man ang Nagsabi - 1965
Sosayting Dukha (song)
Taguan (Sylvia) - 1966
Talusaling Polka - 1964
Tampal  - 1969
Tampuhan
Taradyin Pot Pot
Tayo'y Mamasko
Tingnan Natin
Tinikling (Sylvia) - 1963
Tirana Biya
Tugtugan - 1969
Tsimoy at Tsimay with Bobby Gonzales
Tunay na Ligaya
Twit Twit Twit - 1963
Walang Kuarta
Waray-Waray - 1954

References

External links
La Torre at the Internet Movie Database website
La Torre at Allmusic.com
 

1933 births
2022 deaths
Filipino expatriates in the United States
20th-century Filipino women singers
Filipino film actresses
Filipino musical theatre actresses
Filipino television actresses
Actresses from Manila